Kolamaafushi (Dhivehi: ކޮލަމާފުށި) is one of the inhabited islands of Gaafu Alif Atoll.

Geography
It is one of the remotest islands in the Huvadhu Atoll, being about 20 km away from the closest inhabited island. The island is connected to the nearby Kolaa island by a narrow causeway.

Demography

The total population of Kolamaafushi is 1857. There are 1085 women in Kolamaafushi which includes 228 below the age of 18, 801 between 18 and 65 years and 35 above 65 years. As of men, there are a total of 779 men: 238 under 18 years, 505 between 18 and 65 years and 36 above 65 years.

The island was the third most populous in the atoll till mid 2000s, however vast numbers of migrations for the past 15 years have brought down the population below 1000.

Economy
Traditionally, its economic activity is pole and line fishing for Tuna (Skipjacks, Yellowfins, Big-eyes ets) using modern mechanized boats. The businessmen of Kolamaafushi have also begun few other economic activities like agriculture, boat building and rearing of cattle (goats only). These activities are carried out in the uninhabited island, which was previously a separate island later joined to Kolamaafushi.

Education
Atholhu Madharusaa 1
Edhuruge  8
Pre School 2
Tuition Class 2
Quran Class 2

References

External links
www.gaafalif.gov.mv/Islands.aspx?iid=2
kolamaafushi.forumcircle.com/profile.php?mode=register&
https://web.archive.org/web/20110716141919/http://www.dhivehiobserver.com/images3/Kolamaafushi_Dhoni.jpg

Islands of the Maldives